Erkin Alymbekov is a Kyrgyz politician. He is a former Deputy Speaker in the Kyrgyz Parliament.

References

Members of the Supreme Council (Kyrgyzstan)
Living people
Year of birth missing (living people)
Place of birth missing (living people)